The House of Socialist Agriculture is a building in Tsentralny City District of Novosibirsk, Russia. It is located between Gorky Street, Oktyabrskaya Magistral and Krasny Avenue. The building was designed by architect Nikolay Kuzmin.

History
The House of Socialist Agriculture was built in 1936.
In 1942 Research Institute of Measuring Instruments was located here. It was evacuated to Novosibirsk.
In 1952 the building was reconstructed by architect Nikolay Vasilyev.

Gallery

See also
 100-Flat Building
 Oblplan House

References

External links
 The House of Socialist Agriculture. NII-39. «Дом Соцземледелия». НИИ 39. Novosibdom.ru.

Tsentralny City District, Novosibirsk
Buildings and structures in Novosibirsk
Buildings and structures completed in 1936
Buildings and structures built in the Soviet Union